The 1980 San Diego Padres season was the 12th season in franchise history.

Offseason 
 October 3, 1979: Mickey Lolich was released by the Padres.
 December 3, 1979: Von Joshua was selected off waivers by the Padres from the Los Angeles Dodgers.
 February 15, 1980: Gaylord Perry, Tucker Ashford and Joe Carroll (minors) were traded by the Padres to the Texas Rangers for Willie Montañez.
February 15, 1980: Bob Owchinko was traded by the San Diego Padres with Jim Wilhelm to the Cleveland Indians for Jerry Mumphrey.

Regular season 
Ozzie Smith set a major league record for most assists by a shortstop in 1980 with 621.

Season standings

Record vs. opponents

Opening Day starters 
Dave Cash
Bill Fahey
Randy Jones
Jerry Mumphrey
Gene Richards
Aurelio Rodríguez
Ozzie Smith
Gene Tenace
Dave Winfield

Notable transactions 
 April 2, 1980: Danny Boone was signed as a free agent by the Padres.
 June 3, 1980: Ron Romanick was drafted by the San Diego Padres in the 1st round (7th pick) of the 1980 amateur draft (Secondary Phase), but did not sign.
 June 3, 1980: Gerry Davis was drafted by the Padres in the 6th round of the 1980 Major League Baseball Draft.
 August 9, 1980: Kurt Bevacqua and a player to be named later were traded by the Padres to the Pittsburgh Pirates for Luis Salazar and Rick Lancellotti. The Padres completed the deal by sending Mark Lee to the Pirates on August 9.
 August 7, 1980: Von Joshua was released by the Padres.
 August 25, 1980: Willie Montañez was traded by the Padres to the Montreal Expos for Tony Phillips and cash.

Roster

Player stats

Batting

Starters by position 
Note: Pos = Position; G = Games played; AB = At bats; H = Hits; Avg. = Batting average; HR = Home runs; RBI = Runs batted in

Other batters 
Note: G = Games played; AB = At bats; H = Hits; Avg. = Batting average; HR = Home runs; RBI = Runs batted in

Pitching

Starting pitchers 
Note: G = Games pitched; IP = Innings pitched; W = Wins; L = Losses; ERA = Earned run average; SO = Strikeouts

Other pitchers 
Note: G = Games pitched; IP = Innings pitched; W = Wins; L = Losses; ERA = Earned run average; SO = Strikeouts

Relief pitchers 
Note: G = Games pitched; W = Wins; L = Losses; SV = Saves; ERA = Earned run average; SO = Strikeouts

Awards and honors 
 Ozzie Smith, SS, Gold Glove Award
1980 Major League Baseball All-Star Game

Farm system

References

External links
 1980 San Diego Padres team page at Baseball Reference
 1980 San Diego Padres team page at Baseball Almanac

San Diego Padres seasons
San Diego Padres season
San Diego Padres